The Billington family is a British family of English nationality which has had a history in England as state employed executioners (around  1884 to 1905) as well as several members who ventured into the world of combat sports and professional wrestling. Men of the family have been noted for their rather short height. Two of the family's sports oriented members would go on to marry into the Canadian Hart wrestling family.

Notable members

Executioners

James Billington

James Billington (1847 – 13 December 1901) was a hangman for the British government from 1884 until 1901. Billington was said to have had a "lifelong fascination" with hanging, and made replica gallows in his back yard on which he practised with weights and dummies and, it was rumoured locally, stray dogs and cats. Billington died at home from bronchitis in the early hours of 13 December 1901, one month after his last execution. Billington had three sons – Thomas, William, and John – who all ended up being executioners. He had also been a wrestler in his youth.

Thomas Billington

Thomas Billington (born 1872 - December 1901) was an English executioner from 1897 to 1901. He was the oldest son of James Billington. He gained a job as an assistant executioner in 1897 thanks to his father. He usually worked as an assistant to his father or brother, William. In December 1901, James Billington died. Thomas died in December 1901, within a month of his father of pneumonia at the age of 29.

William Billington

William Billington (1875 – 1952) was an English executioner. He was on the Home Office list from 1902 to 1905. William was second son of executioner James Billington, and carried out his first hanging in July 1899, and underwent formal training in early 1900. After his father died in December 1901, William became the principal executioner for England. He was at first assisted by his older brother Thomas and then by his younger brother John, along with Henry Pierrepoint.

John Billington

John Billington (1880 – October 1905) was an English executioner. He was on the Home Office list from 1901 to 1905. Billington was the youngest son of James Billington In early 1902, at the age of 21, John attended an execution training course at Newgate Prison. His brother William was England's primary executioner by this time, and the two became collaborators. They first worked together on 18 March of that year. John was the assistant for ten of William's commissions in 1902. He helped perform the last execution at Newgate and the first one at Pentonville. Billington died at age 25 in 1905 from injuries sustained through an accident.

Sportspeople

Thomas, Eric and Billy Billington

Thomas Billington was an English bare-knuckle boxer. Billington was known to be a bully in his area and was a highly dreaded figure among his neighbours, no one was allowed to walk outside of his house and no one went near in fear of being victims of his ferocious nature. His wife was called Ellen and he had five children. Eric, William (Bill or Billy for short), Raymond, Mavis and Joyce. Thomas died of lung cancer.

Eric Billington, (born 2 January 1931). Thomas and Ellen’s oldest son became a professional boxer.  During his professional boxing career he was active between 1947 and 1955. He boxed as a lightweight or welterweight and participated in about 91 professional contests. He competed for the Central Area Welterweight Title.

Billy Billington was a boxer and the son of Thomas and Ellen Billington. He had four children, Thomas, Carol, Julie and Mark. He always intended for his oldest son Thomas (often called Tom or Tommy) to become a great boxer and trained him from a very young age. He also introduced his son to former wrestler “Dr Death” Ted Betley who became Thomas’s wrestling trainer.

Joyce Billington Smith was the daughter of Thomas Billington and the wife of Sid Smith. Sid and Joyce had four children, David, Terrence, Joanne and Tracy.

Tom Billington

Thomas "Tom" Billington (5 December 1958 – 5 December 2018), better known by his ring name The Dynamite Kid, was a British professional wrestler and son of Billy Billington. Trained by former wrestler “Dr Death” Ted Betley, He was best known for his time in the World Wrestling Federation (WWF; now known as WWE), Stampede Wrestling, All Japan Pro Wrestling (AJPW), and New Japan Pro-Wrestling (NJPW). Billington is considered by many to be one of the greatest in ring performers in wrestling history and has inspired many other successful wrestlers such as Chris Benoit, Daniel Bryan, Becky Lynch, Stone Cold Steve Austin and countless others.

He was also during his career well known for his short temper and has been referred to as a bully by many of his fellow wrestlers. He once broke Bruce Hart's jaw with one punch after he felt that Hart had slighted him.

From 1982 to 1991, Tom was married to Michelle Smadu, the younger sister of Bret Hart's first wife Julie Smadu.

Davey Boy Smith

David "Davey Boy" Smith (27 November 1962 – 18 May 2002) was a British professional wrestler. He was the son of Sid Smith and Joyce Billington who was the daughter of Thomas Billington. Smith is best known for his tenures in the WWF, NJPW and Stampede Wrestling. Smith married Diana Hart of the Hart wrestling family.

Harry Smith

Harry Francis Smith (born 2 August 1985), better known by the ring names Davey Boy Smith Jr  and David Hart Smith, is a British Canadian pro wrestler. He's best known for his time in Stampede Wrestling, the WWE and NJPW. He is the son of Davey Boy Smith and Diana Hart. Outside of professional wrestling Smith has considered and trained in mixed martial arts.

Notes

References

Sources

Further reading

 
 

 
Professional wrestling families
English executioners
British families